Janek is a given name.

Janek is a family name.
 Ivan Janek (born 1986), Slovak football player
 Jolanta Janek (born 1963), Polish diplomat
 Kyle Janek, M.D. (born 1958), former Republican member of the Texas Senate
 Shane Janek a.k.a. Courtney Act, Australian entertainer
 Tomas Janek, Slovak professional ice hockey player

See also
 Yannick